This Is Who I Am is the fifth studio album by American singer Kelly Price. It was released on October 24, 2006, on the EclecticSounds Entertainment and GospoCentric Records.

Track listing

Notes
 signifies additional producer(s)

Charts

References

2006 albums
Kelly Price albums